Haft Juy (also Romanized as Haft Jūy and Haft Jūi; also known as Haft Jūb) is a village in Haft Juy Rural District of the Central District of Qods County, Tehran province, Iran. At the 2006 National Census, its population was 2,924 in 799 households, when it was in the former Qods District of Shahriar County. The following census in 2011 counted 2,789 people in 865 households, by which time the district had been separated from the county and Qods County established. The latest census in 2016 showed a population of 3,137 people in 950 households; it was the only village in its rural district that reported a population.

References 

Qods County

Populated places in Tehran Province

Populated places in Qods County